In military terms, 4th Brigade may refer to:

Argentina
4th Parachute Brigade (Argentina)

Australia
4th Brigade (Australia)
4th Armoured Brigade (Australia)
4th Light Horse Brigade

Canada
4th Canadian Armoured Brigade
4th Canadian Infantry Brigade
4th Infantry Brigade (Canada)
4 Canadian Mechanized Brigade Group

Croatia
4th Guards Brigade (Croatia)

Czech Republic
4th Rapid Deployment Brigade (Czech Republic)

France
4th Airmobile Brigade (France)

Germany
4th SS Volunteer Panzergrenadier Brigade Netherlands

Japan
4th Cavalry Brigade (Imperial Japanese Army)

Lebanon 
4th Infantry Brigade (Lebanon)

New Zealand 
4th Infantry Brigade (New Zealand)
4th New Zealand Armoured Brigade

Poland
4th Cavalry Brigade (Poland)

Romania
4th Engineer Brigade (Romania)

South Africa
 4th Infantry Brigade (South Africa)

United Kingdom
4th Armoured Brigade (United Kingdom), 1939–1945
4th Cavalry Brigade (United Kingdom)
4th Guards Brigade (United Kingdom)
4th Infantry Brigade (United Kingdom)
4th London Infantry Brigade
4th Mechanized Brigade (United Kingdom)
4th Mounted Brigade (United Kingdom)
4th Parachute Brigade (United Kingdom)
4th Special Service Brigade
 Artillery Brigades
 4th Brigade Royal Field Artillery 
 IV Brigade, Royal Horse Artillery 
 IV Brigade, Royal Horse Artillery (T.F.), Territorial Force

United States
4th Brigade, 1st Armored Division (United States)
4th Brigade, 1st Cavalry Division (United States)
4th Brigade, 1st Infantry Division (United States)
4th Brigade Combat Team, 2nd Infantry Division (United States)
4th Brigade Combat Team, 10th Mountain Division (United States)
4th Brigade, 104th Division (United States)
4th Cavalry Brigade (United States)
4th Sustainment Brigade